is a Japanese actress. She is a former top musumeyaku of the Soragumi of the Takarazuka Revue. She is nicknamed .

Nono is represented with Umeda Arts Theater. As a musumeyaku (playing young female characters) who was skilled in dancing, acting and singing, she was billed as "Takarazuka's Maya Kitajima" (after the lead character in the manga Glass Mask) and rose to become a top musumeyaku at the Takarazuka Revue in only five years. After leaving the revue Nono later performed in stage musicals and television dramas.

During Takarazuka Revue

Hanagumi era

Soragumi Top Musume era

After Takarazuka Revue

Stage

TV drama

Other TV programmes

Films

Radio

Awards

References

External links
 
 
Nestlé Amuse Takarazuka Star Talk: Sumika Nono 
Sankei Enak The name of Takaragenne II 

21st-century Japanese actresses
Actors from Kyoto Prefecture
1987 births
Living people